#The1st28 is the collaborative mixtape by American rappers Curren$y and Styles P. It was released for online download on February 28, 2012. The mixtape was entirely produced by Monsta Beatz.

Track listing
 All songs produced by Monsta Beatz

References

2012 mixtape albums
Currensy albums
Styles P albums